Valdemar I is the name of:

 Vladimir I of Kiev (c. 950–1015), grand prince of Kiev
 Valdemar I of Denmark (1131–1182), King of Denmark from 1157 until 1182
 Valdemar of Sweden (1239–1302)